The Ivy League Men's Soccer Player of the Year is an annual award presented by the Ivy League to the best offensive and defensive player in the conference. From 1979 until 2012 there was one award presented. Starting in 2013, two awards were presented: the offensive and defensive players of the year.

Key

Winners

Player of the Year (1979–2012)

Offensive Player of the Year (2013–)

Defensive Player of the Year (2013–)

References
General
 

Footnotes

College soccer trophies and awards in the United States
Ivy
Player of the Year
Awards established in 1979
1979 establishments in the United States